Badak, also known as Cap Badak, is a cola manufactured by PT Pabrik Es Siantar in 1916. Native to Pematangsiantar, it is one of the most iconic drinks in the North Sumatra area, particularly Medan.

History 
Badak was manufactured by NV Ijs Fabriek Siantar, the later PT Pabrik Es Siantar, the first Indonesian soft drink company. A Hallauan chemist named Heinrich Surbeck went to Pematangsiantar, North Sumatra in 1916 and started manufacturing the cola. The exact reason why Surbeck chose the location is because in the 20th century, new farms grew around the area, and Pematangsiantar became a cargo hub between the provincial capital Medan and other cities, as well as the richness of the clean water. Off from their main project, Ijs Fabriek Siantar also helped the area's electrical distribution; the company was respected so much, that a movie theatre reserved seven seats for the company.

The company started with manufacturing ice cubes as well as passion fruit concentrates, which were later discontinued, the company released Badak to the public in the 1920s. Badak is Indonesian for rhinoceros; named so by the company because they said its hard skin and strong horns meant that Badak will stand strong against other international rivals. However, in the 1920s, rivals like Coca-Cola and Fanta were starting to be distributed to the country, burdening the company and especially Surbeck, who was killed by the Indonesians who fought against the Dutch post-independence. Factory worker Elman Tanjung replaced Surbeck's role. Due to the nationalization post-independence, in 1971 pribumi Julius Hutabarat later took Tanjung's role. Currently, her son Ronald Hutabarat is the man in charge.

After Julius taking the role as manager, Badak resurged, and eight new flavors were introduced: orange, grape, pineapple, American ice cream soda, tonic water, coffee, raspberry, and sarsaparilla. The last flavor was the most successful of them all, which was imported to Surbeck's home country, Switzerland. However, for the other flavors, distribution limits to only Sumatra and fragments of Java, especially the capital Jakarta. During its golden era, around the 1970s up to 1980s, production surged up to 40 thousand crates per month. However, as demands lowered, production was also lowered to 500 per month. Six flavors were also discontinued due to high budget and the overwhelmingly recurring process of cleaning the machines every four hours, leaving only the tonic water and sarsaparilla flavor still being manufactured. Health concerns about soft drinks also contributed to the decline, although many parents who are scared of doctors used to, instead, prescribe bottles of Badak to their children. Many of them were reported to be healed.

Currently, Badak's production is also still slowly declining, although many people, particularly those in the North Sumatra area, still cherished it. There is said to be an Internet fanbase dedicated to the drink. Concerned over its decline, many investors have been working with Pabrik Es Siantar to ensure the drinks continued survival.

Bottle and ingredients 

Badak is made of 100ml of water, 80 mg of carbon dioxide, 5g of sodium nitrate, 5g of sodium, and 20 mg of sulfate. The Badak bottle is made of hard glass, in order to keep the carbon dioxide in the drink. Its old fruit flavors were made by cooking sugar for some time, before being added with sucrose, clean water, and citric acid. Finally, it was mixed with water and carbon dioxide. In some places, a milked Badak (Indonesian: Susu Badak) is offered, mixing condensed milk with the drink.

References 

Food and drink in Indonesia
Soft drinks
Products introduced in 1916